Islands Disappear is Said the Whale's second full-length album. It was released on October 13, 2009. Music videos for some of the songs have been made and are available on YouTube. Like their first album many of the songs reference events or places in Vancouver, British Columbia.

Reception 

Chart wrote, in a positive review of the album, "We all know Said The Whale have what it takes to make a raucous pop album, but they've instead opted for substance over flare. That chosen direction has them drifting toward New Pornographers territory—crafting songs that start simply, change direction, then gradually mutate into singalong choruses."

Track listing
All songs written by Bancroft and Worcester.

Personnel
Ben Worcester - guitar, vocals
Tyler Bancroft - guitar, vocals
Peter Carruthers - bass, vocals
Spencer Schoening - drums
Jaycelyn Brown - keyboards

Production
 Howard Redekopp - producer, recording, mixer

References 

2009 albums
Said the Whale albums